The Dowagiac River is a southwesterly flowing  stream in the Lower Peninsula of the U.S. state of Michigan. It is tributary to the St. Joseph River which flows, in turn, into eastern Lake Michigan.

Habitat and Ecology
The Dowagiac River is unusual in southern Michigan, being similar in temperature and flow to northern trout streams such as the Au Sable River. High groundwater contributions along much of the Dowagiac River’s length provide cold temperatures and steady base flow throughout the summer season. In July river temperatures range in the middle 60's which is ideal for non-native brown trout (Salmo trutta). There are two dams in the watershed: Lower Mill Pond Dam on Dowagiac Creek upstream from the city of Dowagiac and Barron Lake Road Dam on McKinzie Creek.

The dam was ordered repaired or removed by the Michigan Department of Environmental Quality (MDEQ) for safety reasons in 2013. In fact, the St. Joseph River Watershed Fish Migration Barrier Inventory in 2011 ranked the Pucker Street Dam as the highest priority dam for removal in the entire St. Joseph River watershed for conservation and restoration purposes. Removal of the dam began in September 2019 and the project is expected to continue through 2021.

Watershed and Course
The Dowagiac River watershed drains . The Dowagiac River mainstem is formed by the confluence of the Dowagiac Drain and the Lake of the Woods Drain near the southern edge of Hamilton Township, becoming the Dowagiac River before entering Wayne Township in Cass County.

The headwaters begin as the Dowagiac Drain which rises a few miles east of Decatur in central Decatur Township in southern Van Buren County, Michigan. Flowing west and south, it is joined first by Red Run and then by Lake of the Woods Drain to form the Dowagiac River. The river is joined from the north first by Osborn Drain and then Silver Creek. North of the city of Dowagiac, the river passes through the Dowagiac Swamp. The creek flows southwest into LaGrange Lake in LaGrange Township. From the outflow of the lake, it continues west and north through the city of Dowagiac before joining the Dowagiac River. As the river continues south-southwest it is joined by Peavine Creek, Pokagon Creek, and McKinzie Creek.

The watershed includes all or portions of the following townships:
In the southern tier of Van Buren County
Porter Township
Decatur Township
Hamilton Township
Keeler Township

In Cass County
Marcellus Township
Volinia Township
Wayne Township
Silver Creek Township
Penn Township (the western edge around section 7)
Lagrange Township
Pokagon Township
Howard Township

In Berrien County
Niles Township

Tributaries of the Dowagiac River from the mouth
McKinzie Creek
Pokagon Creek
Peavine Creek
Dowagiac Creek
LaGrange Lake
Kelsey Lake
Bunker Lake
Finch Lake
Fish Lake
Saddlebag Lake
Silver Creek
Osburn Drain
Lake of the Woods Drain
Red Run
Dowagiac Drain

See also
 St. Joseph River

References

External links
Friends of the St. Joseph River Association

Rivers of Michigan
Rivers of Berrien County, Michigan
Rivers of Cass County, Michigan
Rivers of Van Buren County, Michigan
Tributaries of Lake Michigan